Germán Paoloski (born May 25, 1974, in Coronel Suárez, Buenos Aires, Argentina) is an Argentine journalist, TV presenter and sports leader.

Biography 
Germán Paoloski study in the Escuela Superior de Ciencias Deportivas. Germán Paoloski studied Social Communication at University of Buenos Aires.

Personal life 
From 2002 to 2006 Germán Paoloski was in a relationship with Silvina Escudero. Since 2009 Germán Paoloski is in a relationship with the actress Sabrina Garciarena. On April 1, 2014, they became parents 
for the first time of a boy whom they called León Paoloski. On May 23, 2017, they became parents for the second time of a boy whom they called Beltrán Paoloski. On May 5, 2020, they became parents for the third time of a girl whom they called Mía Paoloski. Germán Paoloski lives in Buenos Aires, Argentina with Sabrina Garciarena and his children.

Career 
Germán Paoloski started in sports journalism in 1996, with Fernando Niembro and Marcelo Araujo in Radio La Red station for which he made different sports broadcasts. Since 1997 he covered the playing field in the football broadcasts of the Argentina national team for Telefe and since 2002 he was a commentator on the Telefe and Fox Sports. Between 1997 and 2005 he covered the playing field in soccer broadcasts for América TV, TyC Sports and Fútbol de Primera for Canal 13. From 2003 to 2009 he was the Television Presenter of Fútbol para todos broadcast by Fox Sports. In 2007 he was the Host of the Martín Fierro Awards broadcast by Fox Sports. Between 2009 and 2014 he was the Television Presenter of the nightly news of Diario de medianoche broadcast by Telefe. Between 2010 and 2014 he was the Television Presenter of Pura Química broadcast by ESPN+ every day at 2:00 pm, which was also broadcast live on FM 107.9 ESPN Radio. Between 2013 and 2014 he was the Television Presenter of the program Guatsap on the radio station Los 40 principales together with José Chatruc, Cristian Domínguez, Martin Catramado and Paula Varela. In 2015, after passing through ESPN+ and ESPN Radio he was launched by the screen of Fox Sports with the program Nunca es Tarde together with José Chatruc, Darío Barassi and DJ Tommy Muñoz. During 2017 he was part of Radio Rivadavia with the program Vuelta y vuelta. In the month of March 2019, after some negotiations in this regard, he returned to Telefe to be the Television Presenter of the program El noticiero de la gente together with Milva Castellini. On 11 March 2019 the San Luis de Quillota released a statement announcing Germán Paoloski as the new team president that was in the last position of the first B of Chile.

Filmography

Television Programs

Television

References

External links

Living people
Argentine male television actors
Argentine journalists
Male journalists
1974 births